Dzerzhynsk is name of several former toponyms in Ukraine that carried a name of a chekist of Polish descent Felix Dzerzhinsky.

It can refer to:

Romaniv (urban-type settlement), formerly known as Dzerzhynsk
Toretsk, formerly known as Dzerzhynsk

See also
Dzyarzhynsk, Belarus
Dzerzhinsk (disambiguation)